The year 692 BC was a year of the pre-Julian Roman calendar. In the Roman Empire, it was known as year 62 Ab urbe condita . The denomination 692 BC for this year has been used since the early medieval period, when the Anno Domini calendar era became the prevalent method in Europe for naming years.

Events

By place

Middle East 
 Tirhakah, the last Ethiopian pharaoh, ascends the throne of Egypt (approximate date).
 Karib'il Watar of Sabah pays tribute to Sennacherib.

Births

Deaths

References